Malawi has competed in eight Summer Olympic Games. They have never competed in the Winter Olympic Games. Malawi also boycotted the 1976 and 1980 Summer Olympics and returned during the 1984 Summer Olympics.

Malawi has never won an Olympic medal.

Medal tables

Medals by Summer Games

See also
 List of flag bearers for Malawi at the Olympics

References

External links
 
 
 

 
Olympics
Olympics